Eat Your Heart Out may refer to:

Film and TV
Eat Your Heart Out (film)
An episode of The Andy Griffith Show
An episode of Fat Friends
An episode of I Love Money
An episode of The Real Housewives of Beverly Hills
An episode of Total Divas

Music
Eat Your Heart Out (band)
Eat Your Heart Out Records, founded by Alec Empire
An album by Klinik

Songs
"Eat Your Heart Out" Walk the Moon discography
A song by Dio on The Last in Line
A song by Hungry Kids of Hungary on Escapades
A song by Kiss on Monster
A song by Lydia on Paint It Golden
A song by Molly Hatchet on Devil's Canyon
A single by Paul Hardcastle
A song by Prima Donna on Kiss Kiss
A song by Saint Motel on ForPlay
A single by Xavion
A song by Outline In Color

Other uses
Eat Your Heart Out: Food Profiteering in America, a book by Jim Hightower
A story by Richard Dean Starr